Jacey Ray Jetton (born September 14, 1983) is an American politician and business owner serving as a member of the Texas House of Representatives from the 26th district. Jetton was first elected in November 2020 and assumed office in January 2021. He is a member of the Republican Party. Jetton previously served as the chairman of the Fort Bend County Republican Party. Jetton, who is Korean American, was the first Asian American county chair in Texas history.

In 2021, Jetton authored legislation that would prohibit drive-thru voting, which had been introduced in Harris County, Texas, during the COVID-19 pandemic.

References

External links
 Campaign website
 State legislative page

1983 births
Living people
Republican Party members of the Texas House of Representatives
Florida Institute of Technology alumni
21st-century American politicians
American politicians of Korean descent
Asian conservatism in the United States